Charter Oak Mills is a ghost town in the town of Albion, Jackson County, Wisconsin, United States.

Notes

Geography of Jackson County, Wisconsin
Ghost towns in Wisconsin